The 13th Vanier Cup was played on November 19, 1977, at Varsity Stadium in Toronto, Ontario, and decided the CIAU football champion for the 1977 season. The Western Mustangs won their second consecutive championship and fourth overall by defeating the Acadia Axemen by a score of 48-15 in a rematch of the previous year's game. This was the first, and so far only, time that the same two teams played in a Vanier Cup game in consecutive years.

References

External links
 Official website

Vanier Cup
Vanier Cup
1977 in Toronto
November 1977 sports events in Canada